Zhang Yufeng may refer to:
Zhang Yufeng (former secretary of Mao Zedong) (born 1945), personal secretary and mistress of Mao Zedong
Zhang Yufeng (baseball) (born 1977), Chinese baseball player and manager
Zhang Yufeng (footballer) (born 1998), Chinese football player